Kaline Medeiros (born January 5, 1979) is a Brazilian mixed martial artist who competes in the Flyweight and Strawweight division. She has fought in Bellator and Invicta FC.

Mixed martial arts record

|-
| Win
| align=center| 9–6
| Jenna Serio
| Decision (unanimous)
| CES 49
| 
| align=center|3
| align=center|5:00
| Lincoln, Rhode Island
| 
|-
| Loss
| align=center| 8–6
| Mackenzie Dern
| Submission (armbar)
|| Invicta FC 26: Maia vs. Niedzwiedz
| 
| align=center|3
| align=center|4:45
| Kansas City, Missouri
| 
|-
| Loss
| align=center| 8–5
| Angela Hill
| Decision (unanimous)
|| Invicta FC 20: Evinger vs Kunitskaya
| 
| align=center|3
| align=center|5:00
| Kansas City, Missouri
| 
|-
| Win
| align=center| 8–4
| Manjit Kolekar
| Decision (unanimous)
|| Invicta FC 19: Maia vs. Modafferi
| 
| align=center|3
| align=center|5:00
| Kansas City, Missouri
| 
|-
| Win
| align=center| 7–4
| Aline Serio
| TKO (punches)
|| Invicta FC 17: Evinger vs. Schneider
| 
| align=center|2
| align=center|4:04
| Costa Mesa, California
| 
|-
| Win
| align=center| 6–4
| Kathina Catron
| Decision (unanimous)
| Legacy Fighting Championships 45
| 
| align=center|3
| align=center|5:00
| Tulsa, Oklahoma
| 
|-
| Win
| align=center| 5–4
| Sarah Payant
| Submission (kimura)
| Bellator 140
| 
| align=center|1
| align=center|3:24
| Uncasville, Connecticut
| 
|-
| Win
| align=center| 4–4
| Calie Cutler
| Decision (unanimous)
| NEF Fight Night 17
| 
| align=center|3
| align=center|5:00
| Lewiston, Maine
| 
|-
| Loss
| align=center| 3–4
| Chel-c Bailey
| Decision (unanimous)
| Big John's MMA: Ogchidaa Spirit
| 
| align=center|3
| align=center|5:00
| Sault Ste Marie, Michigan
| 
|-
| Win
| align=center| 3–3
| Brigitte Narcise
| Decision (unanimous)
| CES MMA 24
| 
| align=center|3
| align=center|5:00
| Lincoln, Rhode Island
| 
|-
| Win
| align=center| 2–3
| Rachel Sazoff
| Decision (unanimous)
| CES MMA: Rise or Fall
| 
| align=center|3
| align=center|5:00
| Lincoln, Rhode Island
| 
|-
| Loss
| align=center| 1–3
| Peggy Morgan
| Decision (majority)
| Reality Fighting: Mohegan Sun
| 
| align=center|3
| align=center|5:00
| Uncasville, Connecticut
| 
|-
| Win
| align=center| 1–2
| Stephanie Eggink
| KO (punch)
| EB: Beatdown at 4 Bears 10
| 
| align=center| 1
| align=center| 0:07
| New Town, North Dakota
|
|-
| Loss
| align=center| 0–2
| Katie Merrill
| Submission (armbar)
| Victory Promotions: Clementi vs. Rogers
| 
| align=center| 2
| align=center| 1:40
| Lowell, Massachusetts
| 
|-
| Loss
| align=center| 0–1
| Marianna Kheyfets
| Submission (triangle choke)
| Reality Fighting: Mohegan Sun
| 
| align=center| 3
| align=center| 1:14
| Uncasville, Connecticut
| 
|-

References

External links
 

1979 births
Living people
Brazilian female mixed martial artists
Flyweight mixed martial artists
Strawweight mixed martial artists
People from João Pessoa, Paraíba
Brazilian LGBT sportspeople
LGBT mixed martial artists
Lesbian sportswomen
Sportspeople from Paraíba